King of Prussia may refer to:

 A ruler of the former German state of Prussia
List of rulers of Prussia
People
John Carter (smuggler), a Cornish smuggler known as the King of Prussia
 Place names
 King of Prussia, Pennsylvania
 The original name of The Green railway station on the  Ravenglass & Eskdale Railway in Cumbria, England
 Various Coaching Inns in the UK
 Shopping centers
 King of Prussia (shopping mall)